The Anapu River is a river of Pará state in north-central Brazil.
It is a tributary of the Pará River, a channel that connects the Amazon and Tocantins rivers to the south of Marajó island.

The basin of the Anapu River is in the Xingu–Tocantins–Araguaia moist forests ecoregion.

See also
List of rivers of Pará

References

Sources

Rivers of Pará